Negovan may refer to:

Negovan, Bulgaria, a village
Negovan Crag, a peak in Antarctica, named after the village
Flampouro, Florina, a village in northern Greece
Thomas Negovan (born 1971), American historian, musician and writer
Papa Kristo Negovani (1875–1905), Albanian nationalist figure, born in Flampouro/Negovan
Negovan Rajic, winner of the 1978 Prix du Cercle du livre de France

See also
Negovanovtsi, a village in northwestern Bulgaria
Negovani, a village in Greece

Negovano, a ward in south-eastern Zimbabwe